Derbyshire County Council elections are held every four years. Derbyshire County Council is the upper-tier authority for the non-metropolitan county of Derbyshire in England. Since the last boundary changes in 2013, 64 councillors have been elected from 61 electoral divisions.

Political control
Derbyshire County Council was first created in 1889. Its powers and responsibilities were significantly reformed under the Local Government Act 1972, with a new council elected in 1973 to act as a shadow authority ahead of the new powers coming into effect on 1 April 1974. Since 1973, political control of the council has been held by the following parties:

Leadership
The leaders of the council since 1981 have been:

Council elections
1973 Derbyshire County Council election
1977 Derbyshire County Council election
1981 Derbyshire County Council election
1985 Derbyshire County Council election
1989 Derbyshire County Council election
1993 Derbyshire County Council election
1997 Derbyshire County Council election
2001 Derbyshire County Council election
2005 Derbyshire County Council election (boundary changes increased the number of seats by 1)
2009 Derbyshire County Council election
2013 Derbyshire County Council election (boundary changes)
2017 Derbyshire County Council election
2021 Derbyshire County Council election

County result maps

By-election results

1993-1997

1997-2001

2001-2005

2005-2009

2009-2013

2013-2017

2017-2021

2021-2025

References

By-election results

External links
Derbyshire County Council

 
Council elections in Derbyshire
County council elections in England